Oreocalamus may refer to:

Oreocalamus (plant), a genus of plants in the family Poaceae
Oreocalamus (snake), a genus of reptiles in the family Colubridae